Caroline Levine (born December 12, 1970) is an American literary critic. She is the David and Kathleen Ryan Professor of Humanities at Cornell University. Her published works are in the fields of Victorian literature, literary theory, literary criticism, formalism, television, and climate change.

Early life and education 
Born Syracuse, New York, Levine received her AB in comparative literature from Princeton University in 1992. She received her Doctor of Philosophy degree in English from the Birkbeck, University of London, in 1996.

Career 
Levine assumed her position as David and Kathleen Ryan Professor of the Humanities at Cornell University in 2016, and worked as the Picket Family Chair of the English Department from 2018 to 2021. Prior to her work at Cornell, Levine taught at the University of Wisconsin–Madison from 2002 to 2016, and worked as the chair of the English Department from 2013 to 2016. She held previous appointments in the English Department at Rutgers University–Camden (1998–2002) and Wake Forest University (1997–1998).

Levine has published three books of literary criticism: The Serious Pleasures of Suspense: Victorian Realism and Narrative Doubt (2003), which won the Perkins Prize for Best Book in Narrative Studies; Provoking Democracy: Why We Need the Arts (2007); and Forms: Whole, Rhythm, Hierarchy, Network (2015), which was awarded the James Russell Lowell Prize from the Modern Language Association and the Dorothy Lee Award for Outstanding Scholarship in the Ecology of Culture. Flavorwire named Forms as one of the "10 Must-Read Academic Books of 2015," and the book was widely reviewed in venues such as PMLA, the Los Angeles Review of Books, the London Review of Books, and The Times Literary Supplement. 

Levine is the nineteenth-century editor for the Norton Anthology of World Literature. She co-founded the Mellon World Literatures Workshop at the University of Wisconsin Madison

In addition to her scholarship, Levine is an activist and public intellectual working to address climate change and sustainability. She is member of TIAA-Divest and Citizens Climate Lobby and was a key leader in the successful effort to make Cornell University divest from fossil fuels.

Notable works 
The Serious Pleasures of Suspense: Victorian Realism and Narrative Doubt (2003) connects narrative suspense to scientific experimentation. At the same moment that Victorian philosophers of science were arguing that rigorous scientists needed to suspend judgment (testing a hypothesis and waiting to see the results before asserting anything about the world, rather than just leaping to conclusions), novelists were structuring their plots around moments of suspense. Suspense is a narrative strategy of hinting and withholding, inviting readers to speculate about the truth, and so teaches audiences to behave like scientists: to wonder, hypothesize, and then wait for the truth. The Victorian novel — and suspense fiction ever since — helped to democratize and popularize the scientific method.

Provoking Democracy: Why We Need the Arts (2007) considers public controversies over art objects, including public art, copyright, propaganda, and obscenity. It argues that all of these cases revolve around the democratization of culture. Obscenity law first emerges when books start to circulate widely, beyond elites. Our own prevailing definition of art – as that sphere of culture that challenges the majority – comes from the moment of mass democratization of literacy and media in the late nineteenth century. Levine argues that we are still working with the logic of the avant-garde. Even art objects that aren't themselves aren't avant-garde in style or intent are always justified as being ahead of their time, as breaking from convention, and challenging the mainstream. 

In Forms: Whole, Rhythm, Hierarchy, Network (2015), Levine argues that forms organize not only works of art but also political life – and our attempts to know both art and politics. Inescapable and frequently troubling, forms shape every aspect of our experience. Yet, forms don't impose their order in any simple way. Multiple shapes, patterns, and arrangements, overlapping and colliding, generate complex and unpredictable social landscapes that challenge and unsettle conventional analytic models in literary and cultural studies. Borrowing the concept of "affordances" from design theory, this book investigates the specific ways that four major forms – wholes, rhythms, hierarchies, and networks – have structured culture, politics, and scholarly knowledge across periods, and proposes new ways of linking formalism to historicism and literature to politics. Levine rereads both formalist and antiformalist theorists, including Cleanth Brooks, Michel Foucault, Jacques Rancière, Mary Poovey, and Judith Butler, and offers accounts of a wide range of objects, from medieval convents and modern theme parks to Sophocles’s Antigone and the television series The Wire.

Awards 
 2004 Perkins Prize for the "best book in narrative studies" from the Narrative Society.
 2015 James Russell Lowell Prize from the MLA 
 2016 Dorothy Lee Award for Outstanding Scholarship in the Ecology of Culture, Media Ecology Association

Bibliography 
Books
 The Serious Pleasures of Suspense: Victorian Realism and Narrative Doubt. Charlottesville and London: University of Virginia Press, 2003.
 Provoking Democracy: Why We Need the Arts. Oxford: Basil Blackwell, 2007. “Manifestos” series. Polish translation: Od prowokacji do demokracji. Czyli o tym, dlaczego potrzebna nam sztuka. Warsaw: Musa, 2013.
 Forms: Whole, Rhythm, Hierarchy, Network. Princeton University Press, 2015. Turkish translation: 2017. Korean translation under contract.

Anthologies
 Norton Anthology of World Literature: one of a team of co-editors, responsible for the nineteenth-century material. 2012.
 Norton Anthology of World Literature: one of a team of co-editors, responsible for the nineteenth-century material. 2018

Edited Books
 From Author to Text: Re-reading George Eliot’s Romola, collection of essays edited with Mark W. Turner. Aldershot: Ashgate Press, 1998.
 Narrative Middles: Navigating the Nineteenth-Century British Novel: co-edited with Mario-Ortiz-Robles. Ohio State Univ. Press, 2011. Includes co-authored introduction. Paperback: 2015.
 Dr. Jekyll and Mr Hyde, new edition commissioned for the Norton Library series, 2021.

Edited Special Issues of Journals
 “Gender, Genre and George Eliot,” special issue edited with Mark W. Turner, Women’s Writing 3. With co-authored introduction: 95–96. 1996.
 “Reading for Pleasure: The Gender of Popular Genres,” special issue edited with Mark W. Turner, The Journal of Popular Culture 35: 1. With co-authored introduction: 1–4. 2001.
 “What Counts as World Literature?” special issue, edited with Bala Venkat Mani, MLQ 74:2 (June), with co-authored introduction. 2013
 “Television for Victorianists,” special issue of Romanticism and Victorianism on the Net 63 (April), with introduction. 2013.

See also 

 Literary criticism
 Victorian literature

References

External links 
 Cornell Faculty Webpage

1970 births
American writers
American women writers
American literary critics
American women literary critics

Living people
Cornell University faculty